Chris Burnham is a comic book artist known for his work on Batman Incorporated with Grant Morrison, as well as the creator-owned books such as Officer Downe and Nixon's Pals, which were published by Image Comics.

Early life
Born in Connecticut, Burnham grew up in Pittsburgh, Pennsylvania, where he first discovered comics. He studied at George Washington University.

Career

In 2002 Burnham moved to Chicago, where he started to work as a graphic designer. Since then he has produced work for DC Comics, Marvel, Image, Boom! Studios and Moonstone Books. A film called Officer Downe, based on Casey's comic, was released on November 18, 2016.

Bibliography
Interior comic work includes:
Kolchak (with Dave Ulanski, Moonstone Books):
 Tales of the Night Stalker #3: "More Creatures of Habit" (anthology, 2003)
 Black & White & Red All Over (framing sequence, one-shot, 2005)
Moonstone Monsters (anthology one-shots, Moonstone Books):
 Sea Creatures: "Croaked" (with Ben Raab, 2003)
 Witches: "The Witch in the Woods" (with William Messner-Loebs, 2004)
Valentine: The Safecracker's Tale (with Nathan Allen, webcomic, The House Theatre of Chicago, 2005)
Boston Blackie: Bloody Shame: "Inside Out" (with Stefan Petrucha, graphic novel, Moonstone Books, 2005)
Comiculture Anthology Volume 2: "Suffer the Salt" (script and art, anthology graphic novel, Mad Science Media, 2005)
Ten Ton Studios' Jam Comic #1: "pages thirteen and twenty-five" (script and art, webcomic, Ten Ton Studios, 2005)
Mystery Manor: Haunted Theatre #2-3: "Suicide Shift" (script and art, anthology, Silver Phoenix, 2006–2007)
I Have 24 Hours to Live! (script and art, 24-hour webcomic, Ten Ton Studios, 2007)
Elephantmen (with Richard Starkings, Image):
 "Silent Running" (in #9, co-feature, 2007)
 "Dark Heart" (in #16, 2009)
Nixon's Pals (with Joe Casey, graphic novel, Image, 2008)
Fear Agent #21: "A Mammoth Undertaker" (script and art, co-feature, Dark Horse, 2008)
X-Men: Divided We Stand #2: "Idée Fixe" (with Duane Swierczynski, anthology, Marvel, 2008)
X-Men: Manifest Destiny #1: "Boom" (with James Asmus, anthology, Marvel, 2008)
Marvel Mystery Comics 70th Anniversary Special: "Project: Blockbuster!" (with Tom DeFalco, one-shot, Marvel, 2009)
Days Missing #2: "September 12, 1815" (with David Hine, Archaia Studios, 2009)
Hack/Slash (Devil's Due):
 "Nightmare & Sleepy" (with Tim Seeley, in #29, co-feature, 2009)
 "Butterface" (script, art by Stephen Molnar, in Trailers #2, anthology, 2010)
Monster Truck (script and art, webcomic, self-published, 2009)
Munden's Bar pages 45-52: "100 Years of Puberty" (with John Ostrander, anthology webcomic, ComicMix, 2010)
The Amory Wars: In Keeping Secrets of Silent Earth 3 #1-7 (with Peter David and Claudio Sanchez, Boom! Studios, 2010)
Officer Downe: "Tough Shit" (with Joe Casey, one-shot, Image, 2010)
Snake Punch (script and art, 24-hour webcomic, Ten Ton Studios, 2010)
Batman and Robin #16: "Black Mass" (with Grant Morrison, Cameron Stewart and Frazer Irving, DC Comics, 2011)
Crack Comics #63: "A Matter of Some Gravity" (script and art, anthology, Image, 2011)
Batman Incorporated (with Grant Morrison, DC Comics):
 "Nyktomorph" (in vol. 1 #4 and 6-7, 2011)
 Leviathan Strikes! (with Cameron Stewart, one-shot, 2011)
 "Demon Star" (in vol. 2 #1-6, with Andres Guinaldo (#6), 2012–2013)
 "Brand Building" (plot; dialogue by Grant Morrison, art by Frazer Irving, in vol. 2 #0, 2012)
 "Most Wanted" (in vol. 2 #7-10 and 12-13, with Jason Masters (#7-10) and Andrei Bressan (#10), 2013)
 "Interlude: A Bird in the Hand" (script, art by Jorge Lucas, in vol. 2 #11, 2012)
 "Rending Machine" (script and art, in Batman Incorporated Special anthology one-shot, 2013)
Heavy Metal #264: "Milk Run" (script and art, anthology, HM Communications, 2013)
2000 AD Free Comic Book Day 2014: "Judge Dredd: The Badge" (with Matt Smith, anthology, Rebellion, 2014)
The Savage Dragon vol. 2 #200: "Conquering Heroes!" (with Erik Larsen, co-feature, Highbrow Entertainment, 2014)
Nameless #1-6 (with Grant Morrison, Image, 2015)
Secret Wars: E is for Extinction #1-4 (co-writer with Dennis Culver, art by Ramon Villalobos, Marvel, 2015)
Black Light District: "Bizarro" (with Will Knox and Jesse Blaze Snider, anthology webcomic, 2016)
Detective Comics vol. 2 #50: "The Eleven Curious Cases of Batman" (with Peter Tomasi, among other artists, co-feature, DC Comics, 2016)
The Mighty Thor #700 (with Jason Aaron, among other artists, Marvel, 2017)
God Hates Astronauts: 3-D Cowboy's 2-D Spectacular!: "Criminowl Activity Fun!" (with Ryan Browne, anthology, Kickstarter, 2018)
Die!Die!Die! #1-14 (with Robert Kirkman and Scott M. Gimple, Skybound, 2018–2021)
Batman: Pennyworth RIP #1 (with Peter Tomasi, DC Comics, 2020)
Detective Comics #1027 (with Grant Morrison, DC Comics, 2020)
Justice League Incarnate #4 (with Joshua Williamson and Dennis Culver, DC Comics, 2022)
Dark Crisis: Worlds Without a Justice League - Superman #1 (with Tom King, DC Comics, 2022)
Batman: Urban Legends #18-20 (DC Comics, 2022)
Unstoppable Doom Patrol 1-ongoing (with Dennis Culver, DC Comics, 2023-)

Covers only

Notes

References

External links

Interviews
Interview: CHRIS BURNHAM – DC’s Newest Exclusive Artist!, Comicsphere, March 29, 2011
Spotlight Interview on Chris Burnham

1977 births
American comics artists
Living people
Sewickley Academy alumni